Arborfield (2006 Population 329) is a town in east-central Saskatchewan, Canada, approximately  north-east of Melfort.

History
In 1910, the town requested that it be named Fairfield, but that name was rejected by the post office in Ottawa. Because the offer was received on Arbour Day, the Post Office asked if the residents would accept Arborfield, which it did. As well, the town may have been named for Arborfield, England, the site of an engineering museum.

Demographics 

Education
Arborfield School is part of the North East School Division No. 200.

School's history
On 13 October 1910, community settlers in the area met and formed the Arborfield School District No. 2785. The first school board borrowed $1,000 to build the first school in 1911. Many more schools were built and added to the area until 10 March 1930, when a group of local citizens held a meeting to request the formation of another school district. On 11 April 1930, the Department of Education informed the group that the Treasure School District No. 4864 had been erected.

A few years later the name "Treasure" was changed to Arborfield. This was the result of a switching of name titles between two existing school districts - the former "Arborfield" School District (located South of the town) then took the name of "Treasure". The first two-room school was built in the school's present location in 1930–1931. A fire destroyed the original structure in 1947. In 1948 a new six-room school was built.

In 1950, Arborfield S.D. became part of the Tisdale School Unit No. 53. There were many rooms added throughout the years until 1965 when the south / west wing was added – which is now utilised for secondary school instruction.

The 1980s saw other additions such as the building of a gymnasium and shower rooms, introduction of a computer lab and an Industrial Arts Shop.

In 2010, the school consisted of 7 classrooms for Kindergarten to Grade 12, Industrial Arts Shop, Home Ec. Room, science Lab, gymnasium, tuck shop, pre-school room, weight room, library, Windows and Linux computer labs, among other multiuse and utility rooms.

Extra-curricular activities

The school offers various organized extra-curricular activities for the students, including drama and dinner theatre, Elementary Christmas concert, Christmas Dinner with community seniors, delivering meals on wheels, SRC, newsletter committee, Science fair, Arts festival, and high school curling bonspiel. Commercial music instruction is also delivered at the school throughout the year. Sports teams go by the name Arborfield Blues with a mascot of the wolf.

Transportation
Arborfield is located on Highway 23. Highways 335 and 690 are nearby and also service the community.

North-east of Arborfield is Arborfield Airport.

Clubs and organizations
Arborfield Elks Lodge #319
Jordan River Community Club
Masons
Arborfield Health Care
Royal Canadian Legion 
Hall Committee
Arborfield School Community Council
Seniors Group

Recreation
Arborfield Curling Club
Arborfield Skating Rink
Arborfield Figure Skating Club
Arborfield Minor Ball
Arborfield Softball

Churches
Anglican
Catholic
United

See also
 List of communities in Saskatchewan
 List of towns in Saskatchewan
 Thunder Rail Ltd.

References

Towns in Saskatchewan
Elementary schools in Saskatchewan
High schools in Saskatchewan
School buildings completed in 1948